was a Nippon Professional Baseball pitcher. From 1948 to 1955 he went by the name of Koichi Eda.

1923 births
1978 deaths
Baseball people from Hyōgo Prefecture
Japanese baseball players
Nippon Professional Baseball pitchers
Daiei Unions players
Hankyu Braves players
Shochiku Robins players
Taiyō Whales players